The 1838 Coronation Honours were appointments by Queen Victoria to various orders and honours on the occasion of her coronation on 28 June 1838. The honours were published in The London Gazette on 20 July and 24 July 1838.

The recipients of honours are displayed here as they were styled before their new honour, and arranged by honour, with classes (Knight, Knight Grand Cross, etc.) and then divisions (Military, Civil, etc.) as appropriate.

United Kingdom and British Empire

Knight Bachelor

Major Edward Alexander Campbell  of the Bengal Cavalry
Duncan MacDougall, late Lieutenant-Colonel of the 79th Regiment of Highlanders, Knight Commander of the Royal and Military Order of St. Ferdinand
Major-General Jeffrey Prendergast, of the Honourable East India Company's Service
Major Henry Bayly, Knight of the Royal Hanoverian Guelphic Order
Major William Lloyd, of the Honourable East India Company's Service
Charles Shaw, Knight Commander of the Royal Portuguese Military Order of the Tower and Sword, and Knight Commander of the Spanish Military Order of San Fernando
Charles Frederick Williams, of Lennox lodge, Hayling, Hants., and Upper Bedford-place, in the county of Middlesex
Edward Johnson, of Greenhill, Weymouth, in the county of Dorset, of the Royal and Distinguished Order of Charles the Third of Spain
John Kirkland, of Hampton and Pall-mall, in the county of Middlesex
William Newbigging  of Edinburgh
William Hyde Pearson  of Clapham, in the county of Surrey

The Most Honourable Order of the Bath

Knight Grand Cross of the Order of the Bath (GCB)

Military Division

Admiral Sir William Sidney Smith 
Lieutenant-General Sir John Lambert 
Lieutenant-General the Honourable Sir Robert William O'Callaghan 
Major-General Sir Alexander Dickson 
Major-General Sir Alexander Caldwell  of the Bengal Army and East India Company
Major-General Sir James Law Lushington  of the Madras Army and East India Company

Civil Division

Archibald, Earl of Gosford
Lord George William Russell, Her Majesty's Envoy Extraordinary and Minister Plenipotentiary to His Majesty the King of Prussia
Charles Augustus Lord Howard de Walden, Her Majesty's Envoy Extraordinary and Minister Plenipotentiary to Her Most Faithful Majesty
Richard Jenkins, of the East India Company's Civil Service

Knight Commander of the Order of the Bath (KCB)

Military Division

Army
Admiral John Lawford
Major-General Andrew Pilkington 
Major-General John Gardiner 
Major-General Sir Arthur Benjamin Clifton 
Major-General Lord Greenock 
Major-General Sir Willoughby Cotton 
Major-General Sir John George Woodford 
Major-General Sir Patrick Lindesay 
Major-General Charles James Napier 
Major-General Sir Evan John Murray MacGregor 
Major-General Edward Gibbs 
Major-General George Thomas Napier 
Major-General the Honourable Hercules R. Pakenham 
Major-General Sir John Thomas Jones  
Major-General Sir John Harvey 
Major-General Sir Leonard Greenwell 
Major-General Sir Robert Henry Dick 
Major-General Sir Neil Douglas 
Rear-Admiral Sir John Acworth Ommanney 
Major-General Alexander Cameron 
Major-General John Fox Burgoyne 

East India Company
Major-General John Rose   of the Bengal Infantry
Major-General Thomas Corsellis   of the Bombay Infantry 
Major-General William Richards   of the Bengal Infantry 
Major-General Thomas Whitehead   of the Bengal Infantry 
Major-General John Doveton  of the Madras Cavalry
Major-General David Foulis   of the Madras Cavalry
Major-General Sir Thomas Anburey  of the Bengal Engineers

Companion of the Order of the Bath (CB)

Military Division
Royal Navy

Captain Sir Edward Thomas Troubridge 
Captain Cuthbert Featherstone Daly
Captain Edward Pelham Brenton
Captain Richard Arthur
Captain James Andrew Worthy
Captain Robert Morgan George Festing
Captain Barrington Reynolds
Captain Robert Maunsell

Army

Colonel William Wood, 41st foot
Colonel William Warre. Unattached
Colonel George C. D'Aguilar, Unattached, Deputy Adjutant-General in Ireland
Colonel Henry Sullivan, 6th Foot
Colonel Stephen A. Goodman, 48th Foot
Colonel Edward Wynyard, unattached
Colonel George Brown, Rifle Brigade
Colonel Charles Edward Conyers, Inspecting Field Officer
Colonel James Allan, 57th Foot
Colonel David Forbes, 78th Foot
Colonel Henry Adolphus Proctor, 6th Foot
Colonel Edward Parkinson, 11th Foot
Colonel Thomas Francis Wade, Unattached
Colonel Richard Egerton, Unattached
Colonel William Chalmers, 57th Foot
Colonel Chatham Horace Churchill, 31st Foot, Quartermaster-General in India
Colonel James Grant, 23d Foot
Colonel Thomas William Taylor, Lieutenant-Governor, Royal Military College
Colonel John Morillyon Wilson, 77th Foot
Colonel Thomas Willshire, 2nd Foot
Colonel Henry Oglander, 26th Foot
Colonel Edward Fleming, Inspecting Field Officer
Colonel Philip Bainbridge, Assistant Quartermaster-General
Colonel Sempronius Stretton, 84th Foot
Colonel Thomas E. Napier, Chasseurs Britanniques
Colonel Nathaniel Thorn, Assistant Quartermaster-General
Colonel William Henry Sewell, 31st Foot, Deputy Quartermaster-General in India
Colonel Joseph Thackwell, 3rd Dragoons
Colonel Alexander Macdonald, Royal Artillery
Colonel Sir William L. Herries, Unattached
Colonel Thomas Staunton St. Clair, Unattached
Colonel George William Paty, 94th Foot
Colonel Thomas James Wemyss, 99th Foot
Colonel Robert Burd Gabriel, 2nd Dragoons
Colonel William Rowan, Unattached
Colonel James Shaw Kennedy, Unattached
Colonel George Leigh Goldie, 11th Foot
Colonel George Couper, Unattached
Colonel Henry Rainey, Unattached
Colonel the Honourable Charles Gore, Deputy Quartermaster-General in Canada
Colonel Griffith George Lewis, Royal Engineers
Colonel George Judd Harding, Royal Engineers
Lieutenant-Colonel John Gurwood, Unattached
Lieutenant-Colonel Walter Frederick O'Reilly, Royal African Corps
Lieutenant-Colonel Alexander Kennedy Clark, 7th Dragoon Guards
Lieutenant-Colonel Edward T. Michell, Royal Artillery
Lieutenant-Colonel Thomas Blanchard, Royal Engineers
Lieutenant-Colonel Thomas Dyneley, Royal Artillery
Lieutenant-Colonel William Reid, Royal Engineers
Lieutenant-Colonel William Bolden Dundas, Royal Artillery
Lieutenant-Colonel John Neave Wells, Royal Engineers
Lieutenant-Colonel William Brereton, Royal Artillery
Lieutenant-Colonel John Owen, Royal Marines
Lieutenant-Colonel Charles Cornwallis Dansey, Royal Artillery

East India Company
Colonel William Turner, of the Bombay Cavalry
Colonel William Hull, of the Bombay Infantry
Colonel Sir James Limond   of the Madras Artillery
Colonel William Sandwith, of the Bombay Infantry
Colonel James F. Salter, of the Bombay Infantry
Colonel Henry George Andrew Taylor, of the Madras Infantry
Colonel Herbert Bowen, of the Bengal Infantry
Colonel F. S. T. Johnstone, of the Bengal Cavalry
Colonel Sir Robert Cunliffe  of the Bengal Infantry
Colonel Peter de la Motte, of the Bombay Cavalry
Colonel Edward Frederick, of the Bombay Infantry
Colonel James Kennedy, of the Bengal Cavalry
Colonel Sir Jeremiah Bryant  of the Bengal Infantry
Colonel Edmund F. Waters, of the Bengal Infantry
Colonel William S. Whish, of the Bengal Artillery
Colonel William Battine, of the Bengal Artillery
Colonel Archibald Galloway, of the Bengal Infantry
Colonel Lechmere Russell, of the Bombay Artillery
Colonel Robert Home, of the Madras Infantry
Lieutenant-Colonel James H. Frith, of the Madras Artillery
Lieutenant-Colonel Henry Cock, of the Bengal Infantry
Lieutenant-Colonel Charles Herbert, of the Madras Infantry
Lieutenant-Colonel John Morgan, of the Madras Infantry
Lieutenant-Colonel Josiah Stewart, of the Madras Infantry
Lieutenant-Colonel William Williamson, of the Madras Infantry
Lieutenant-Colonel Henry Hall, of the Bengal Infantry
Lieutenant-Colonel John Cheape, of the Bengal Engineers
Lieutenant-Colonel John Low, of the Madras Infantry
Lieutenant-Colonel John Colvin, of the Bengal Engineers
Lieutenant-Colonel Alexander Tulloch, of the Madras Infantry
Lieutenant-Colonel S. W. Steel, of the Madras Infantry
Lieutenant-Colonel Joseph Orchard, of the Bengal Infantry
Lieutenant-Colonel Charles Graham, of the Bengal Artillery
Major John Herring, of the Bengal Infantry
Major Edward A. Campbell, of the Bengal Cavalry
Major P. Montgomerie, of the Madras Artillery
Major W. J. Butterworth, of the Madras Infantry
Major John Purton, of the Madras Engineers
Major John Cameron, of the Madras Infantry
Major Thomas Lumsden, of the Bengal Artillery
Major Thomas Timbrell, of the Bengal Artillery

References

1838
1838 awards
1838 in the United Kingdom